Sirel is an Estonian language surname meaning "lilac". Notable people with the surname include:

Indrek Sirel (born 1970), commander of Estonian Defence Forces
Jaanus Sirel (born 1975), Estonian footballer
Nijat Sirel (1897–1959), Turkish sculptor

Estonian-language surnames